Sujit Chattopadhyay is an Indian teacher. He is fondly known as Two Rupees Teacher. In 2021, he has been awarded Padma Shri by the Indian Government for his contribution in education.

Early life
Chattopadhyay is from Burdwan.

Career
Chattopadhyay is a former president of Ramnagar Uccha Madhyamik Vidyalaya.  He taught for 40 years before his retirement. He gives private tuition to poor students. He teaches students of class nine, ten, eleven, twelve. The name of his school is Sadai Fakirer Pathshala.

Awards
Padma Shri in 2021

References

Living people
Year of birth missing (living people)